Karl E. Spear  (December 15, 1910 – March 11, 1981) was an American football coach and college athletic administrator. He served as the head football coach at Baker University in Baldwin City, Kansas for 17 seasons, from 1946 to 1962, compiling a record of 87–61–4.

After working as head coach, Spear resigned to become the athletic director of the school. He also coached other sports at Baker, including many years of success as the head golf coach.

Spear died of cancer in 1981.

Head coaching record

Football

References

External links
 

1910 births
1981 deaths
Baker Wildcats athletic directors
Baker Wildcats football coaches
College golf coaches in the United States
People from Baldwin City, Kansas
People from Wellington, Kansas
Deaths from cancer in Kansas